Nahum Nir-Rafalkes (17 March 1884 – 10 July 1968) was a Zionist activist, Israeli politician and one of the signatories of the Israeli declaration of independence. He was the only Speaker of the Knesset not to have been a member of the ruling party until Benny Gantz in 2020.

Biography
Nahum Rafalkes (later Nir-Rafalkes) was born in Warsaw, then part of the Russian Empire. He studied at a Heder in the city before studying natural sciences at university in Warsaw, Zurich and St Petersburg. He also studied law at St Petersburg and Dorpat, gaining a LL.D in 1908.

In 1903, he joined the Zionist student's organisation Kadima, and was a delegate to the Sixth Zionist Congress that year. Two years later he joined Poale Zion, and was also involved in the founding of World Poale Zion. Nir also served as head of the Polish Waiter's Union, and in 1906 led what he claimed to be the world's first successful strike against tipping. That year he was sent to prison for political activities, but still attended the seventh Zionist congress the following year. In 1919 he was elected to Warsaw City Council.

He was offered the position of Commissar for Jewish Affairs but turned it down after consultation with the Central Committee of Poale Zion.

When Poale Zion split, Nir joined the left-wing faction. He served as secretary of the Left World Union of Poale Zion, and was involved in negotiations to allow it to join Comintern. In 1925 he immigrated to Mandate Palestine and worked as a lawyer. In February 1948, he was elected head of the Economic Control Office.

Political career
Nir Rafalkes continued to play a prominent role in Poale Zion and was a member of the Jewish National Council and the Assembly of Representatives prior to independence. A member of Moetzet HaAm (later the Provisional State Council), Nir signed the Israeli declaration of independence in 1948. That same year, his party merged with Mapam and Nir was elected to the First Knesset in 1949. He served as Deputy Speaker of the Knesset and chaired the Constitution, Law and Justice Committee.

Nir lost his seat in the 1951 elections. In 1954, Ahdut HaAvoda (a faction related to the Left Poale Zion) broke away from Mapam, and Nir assumed membership of the new party. He was returned to the Knesset on its list, when Tzipora Laskov resigned from her seat in October 1955, and again chaired the Constitution, Law and Justice Committee.

He was initially re-appointed Deputy Speaker of the Knesset, but following the death of the incumbent Yosef Sprinzak in January 1959, Nir stood in the election for a new speaker against a Mapai (Ben-Gurion's party) candidate. Nir won the election due to the support of the right-wing opposition and several minor left-wing parties, marking the only time to date in which a candidate not from the ruling party has been elected Speaker, until Benny Gantz in 2020.

Nir retained his seat in the November 1959 elections, and chaired the committee for public services, but resumed his position as Deputy Speaker when the Knesset reconvened. After being re-elected in 1961 he served again as Deputy speaker and chairman of the committee for public services. He lost his seat in the 1965 elections.

Published works
Chapters of Life - The scope of the generation and the movement 1884-1918 (1958)

References

External links
 

1884 births
1968 deaths
Jews from the Russian Empire
Polish emigrants to Mandatory Palestine
Politicians from Warsaw
People from Warsaw Governorate
Jews in Mandatory Palestine
Jewish socialists
Members of the Assembly of Representatives (Mandatory Palestine)
Signatories of the Israeli Declaration of Independence
Poale Zion politicians
Mapam politicians
Ahdut HaAvoda politicians
Members of the 1st Knesset (1949–1951)
Members of the 3rd Knesset (1955–1959)
Members of the 4th Knesset (1959–1961)
Members of the 5th Knesset (1961–1965)
Speakers of the Knesset
Deputy Speakers of the Knesset